The  was an infantry division of the Imperial Japanese Army. It was formed on 2 April 1945 in Hiroshima as a triangular division. It was one of a batch of eight divisions comprising the 201st, 202nd, 205th,  206th, 209th, 212th, 214th and 216th Divisions that were created as part of the Japanese reaction to the Battle of Okinawa.

Action
In June 1945, the 205th Division was deployed at Kōchi. It did not see any combat, and was disbanded after the surrender of Japan on 15 August 1945.

See also
 List of Japanese Infantry Divisions

Notes and references
This article incorporates material from Japanese Wikipedia page 第205師団 (日本軍), accessed 14 July 2016
 Madej, W. Victor, Japanese Armed Forces Order of Battle, 1937–1945 [2 vols], Allentown, PA: 1981.

Japanese World War II divisions
Infantry divisions of Japan
Military units and formations established in 1945
Military units and formations disestablished in 1945
1945 establishments in Japan
1945 disestablishments in Japan